The 2013 Oakland Athletics season  was the 45th for the franchise at O.co Coliseum, as well as the 113th in club history. Oakland was defending their division title in the new five-team American League West during the 2013 season. On September 22, 2013, they clinched their second straight American League West championship. They lost to the Detroit Tigers in five games in the 2013 American League Division Series.

Offseason
Following a successful 2012 season in which the team won the AL West, GM Billy Beane stated he would keep the team mostly intact, and "if moves are made, they will be additions". The first acquisition occurred October 19 in a three-team trade involving  Arizona and Miami; Oakland sent Cliff Pennington to Arizona and minor leaguer Yordy Cabrera to Miami, and the team received Chris Young from Arizona. In November, the team traded pitcher Tyson Ross and minor leaguer A. J. Kirby-Jones to San Diego for infielder Andy Parrino and pitcher Andrew Werner. Grant Green, Arnold Leon, Shane Peterson, and Michael Ynoa were added to the 40-man roster and Andrew Carignan, Brandon Hicks (who was traded to the Mets) and Jim Miller (who was claimed off waivers by the Yankees and later designated for assignment) were removed. The next move was to trade Collin Cowgill to the Mets for Jefry Marté. When free agent Stephen Drew signed with the Boston Red Sox, Oakland signed Japanese shortstop Hiroyuki Nakajima to a 2-year, $6.5 million deal, with an option for a third year, in order to fill the vacancy. Pitcher Graham Godfrey was sent to Boston as a player to be named later to complete a previous trade, while Brandon McCarthy and Jonny Gomes, who both elected free agency, signed with Arizona and Boston, respectively. In January, Oakland was involved in their second three-team trade of the offseason, trading pitching prospect A. J. Cole back to Washington (he was part of a trade for Gio González the year before) and receiving catcher John Jaso from Seattle. Upon the acquisition of Jaso, George Kottaras was designated for assignment. In February, the A's were involved in a five-player deal with new division rival Houston, trading Chris Carter, Brad Peacock and Max Stassi in exchange for shortstop Jed Lowrie and reliever Fernando Rodriguez.

In addition to player movement, there was also a coaching change made by the Athletics. Bullpen coach Rick Rodriguez was offered a position within the organization, and Darren Bush, the manager of the Triple-A affiliate Sacramento River Cats, will assume bullpen coaching responsibilities.

Regular season

American League West

American League Wild Card

Game log 

|- style="text-align:center; style="background:#fbb;"
| 1 || April 1 || Mariners || 0–2 || Hernández (1–0) || Anderson (0–1) || Wilhelmsen (1) || 36,067 || 0–1 
|- style="text-align:center; style="background:#fbb;"
| 2 || April 2 || Mariners || 1–7 || Iwakuma (1–0) || Parker (0–1) ||  || 15,315 || 0–2 
|- style="text-align:center; style="background:#bfb;"
| 3 || April 3 || Mariners || 6-2 || Milone (1–0) || Saunders (0–1) ||  || 15,162 || 1–2
|- style="text-align:center; style="background:#bfb;"
| 4 || April 4 || Mariners || 8–2 || Griffin (1–0) || Maurer (0–1) ||  || 12,134 || 2–2
|- style="text-align:center; style="background:#bfb;"
| 5 || April 5 || @ Astros || 8–3 || Straily (1–0) || Peacock (0–1) ||  || 18,197 || 3–2
|- style="text-align:center; style="background:#bfb;"
| 6 || April 6 || @ Astros || 6–3 || Colón (1–0) || Norris (1–1) || Balfour (1) || 18,685 || 4–2
|- style="text-align:center; style="background:#bfb;"
| 7 || April 7 || @ Astros || 9–3 || Anderson (1–1) || Harrell (0–2) ||  || 16,914 || 5–2
|- style="text-align:center; style="background:#bfb;"
| 8 || April 9 || @ Angels || 9–5 || Cook (1–0) || Jepsen (0–1) ||  || 44,014 || 6–2
|- style="text-align:center; style="background:#bfb;"
| 9 || April 10 || @ Angels || 11–5 || Milone (2–0) || Blanton (0–2) ||  || 36,011 || 7–2
|- style="text-align:center; style="background:#bfb;"
| 10 || April 11 || @ Angels || 8–1 || Griffin (2–0) || Vargas (0–1) ||  || 43,533 || 8–2
|- style="text-align:center; style="background:#bfb;"
| 11 || April 12 || Tigers || 4–3(12) || Resop (1–0) || Villarreal (0–2) ||  || 21,377 || 9–2
|- style="text-align:center; style="background:#fbb;"
| 12 || April 13 || Tigers || 3–7 || Verlander (2–1) || Anderson (1–2) ||  || 35,067 || 9-3
|- style="text-align:center; style="background:#fbb;"
| 13 || April 14 || Tigers || 1–10 || Sánchez (2–0) || Parker (0–2) ||  || 20,755 || 9–4
|- style="text-align:center; style="background:#bfb;"
| 14 || April 15 || Astros || 11–2 || Milone (3–0) || Bédard (0–1) ||  || 10,689 || 10–4
|- style="text-align:center; style="background:#bfb;"
| 15 || April 16 || Astros || 4–3 || Doolittle (1–0) || Cruz (0–1) || Balfour (2) || 11,038 || 11–4
|- style="text-align:center; style="background:#bfb;"
| 16 || April 17 || Astros || 7–5 || Colón (2–0) || Norris (2–2) || Balfour (3) || 15,488 || 12-4
|- style="text-align:center; style="background:#fbb;"
| 17 || April 19 || @ Rays || 3–8 || Cobb (2–1) || Anderson (1–3) ||  || 15,115 || 12-5
|- style="text-align:center; style="background:#fbb;"
| 18 || April 20 || @ Rays || 0–1 || Hellickson (1–1) || Parker (0–3) || Rodney (2) || 25,611 || 12-6
|- style="text-align:center; style="background:#fbb;"
| 19 || April 21 || @ Rays || 1–8 || Hernández (1–3) || Milone (3–1) ||  || 25,954 || 12-7
|- style="text-align:center; style="background:#fbb;"
| 20 || April 22 || @ Red Sox || 6–9 || Doubront (2-0) || Griffin (2–1) || Bailey (4) || 28,926 || 12–8
|- style="text-align:center; style="background:#bfb;"
| 21 || April 23 || @ Red Sox || 13–0 (7) || Colón (3-0) || Aceves (1–1) ||  || 29,006 || 13–8
|- style="text-align:center; style="background:#fbb;"
| 22 || April 24 || @ Red Sox || 5–6 || Lester (4–0) || Anderson (1–4) || Bailey (5) || 29,274 || 13–9
|- style="text-align:center; style="background:#fbb;"
| 23 || April 25 || Orioles || 2–10 || Hammel (3–1) || Parker (0–4) ||  || 11,220 || 13–10
|- style="text-align:center; style="background:#fbb;"
| 24 || April 26 || Orioles || 0–3 || Chen (2-2) || Milone (3–2) || Johnson (9) || 16,944 || 13–11
|- style="text-align:center; style="background:#fbb;"
| 25 || April 27 || Orioles || 3–7 || Tillman (1-1) || Griffin (2–2) || Johnson (10) || 31,292 || 13–12
|- style="text-align:center; style="background:#bfb;"
| 26 || April 28 || Orioles || 9–8 (10) || Blevins (1–0) || Strop (0–1) ||  || 27,475 || 14–12
|- style="text-align:center; style="background:#bfb;"
| 27 || April 29 || Angels || 10–8 (19) || Blevins (2–0) || Enright (0–1) ||  || 11,668 || 15–12
|- style="text-align:center; style="background:#bfb;"
| 28 || April 30 || Angels || 10–6 || Parker (1–4) || Richards (1–2) ||  || 14,764 || 16–12
|-

|- style="text-align:center; style="background:#fbb;"
| 29 || May 1 || Angels || 4–5 || Wilson (3–0) || Milone (3–3) || Frieri (4) || 17,139 || 16–13 
|- style="text-align:center; style="background:#bfb;"
| 30 || May 3 || @ Yankees || 2–0 || Griffin (3–2) || Sabathia (4–3) || Balfour (4) || 38,090 || 17–13
|- style="text-align:center; style="background:#fbb;"
| 31 || May 4 || @ Yankees || 2–4 || Hughes (1–2) || Colón (3–1) ||  || 41,349 || 17–14
|- style="text-align:center; style="background:#bfb;"
| 32 || May 5 || @ Yankees || 5-4 || Doolittle (2–0) || Logan (2–2)  || Balfour (5) || 38,134 || 18–14
|- style="text-align:center; style="background:#fbb;"
| 33 || May 6 || @ Indians || 3–7 || Jiménez (2–2) || Parker (1–5) ||  || 9,514 || 18–15
|- style="text-align:center; style="background:#fbb;"
| 34 || May 7 || @ Indians || 0–1 || McAllister (3–3) || Milone (3–4) || Perez (4) || 9,474 || 18–16
|- style="text-align:center; style="background:#fbb;"
| 35 || May 8 || @ Indians || 3–4 || Masterson (5–2) || Griffin (3–3) || Perez (5) || 11,125 || 18–17
|- style="text-align:center; style="background:#fbb;"
| 36 || May 9 || @ Indians || 2–9 || Kazmir (2–1) || Colón (3–2) ||  || 12,477 || 18–18
|- style="text-align:center; style="background:#fbb;"
| 37 || May 10 || @ Mariners || 3–6 || Iwakuma (4–1) || Straily (1–1) || Wilhelmsen (10) || 25,509 || 18–19
|- style="text-align:center; style="background:#bfb;"
| 38 || May 11 || @ Mariners || 4–3 || Parker (2–5) || Maurer (2–5) || Balfour (6) || 30,089 || 19–19
|- style="text-align:center; style="background:#fbb;"
| 39 || May 12 || @ Mariners || 1–6 || Saunders (3–4) || Milone (3–5) ||  || 27,599 || 19–20
|- style="text-align:center; style="background:#bfb;"
| 40 || May 13 || Rangers || 5–1 || Griffin (4–3) || Grimm (2–3) ||  || 11,030 || 20–20
|- style="text-align:center; style="background:#fbb;"
| 41 || May 14 || Rangers || 5–6 || Scheppers (3–0) || Resop (1–1) || Nathan (12) || 12,969 || 20–21
|- style="text-align:center; style="background:#fbb;"
| 42 || May 15 || Rangers || 2–6 || Ogando (4–2) || Straily (1–2) ||  || 20,414 || 20–22
|- style="text-align:center; style="background:#bfb;"
| 43 || May 17 || Royals  || 2–1 || Doolittle (3–0) || Shields (2–4) || Balfour (7) || 14,602 || 21–22
|- style="text-align:center; style="background:#bfb;"
| 44 || May 18 || Royals  || 2–1 || Milone (4–5) || Santana (3–3) || Balfour (8) || 35,067 || 22–22
|- style="text-align:center; style="background:#bfb;"
| 45 || May 19 || Royals  || 4–3 || Blevins (3–0) || Herrera (2–4) || Cook (1) || 20,387 || 23–22
|- style="text-align:center; style="background:#bfb;"
| 46 || May 20 || @ Rangers  || 9–2 || Colón (4–2) || Lindblom (0–1) ||  || 31,865 || 24–22
|- style="text-align:center; style="background:#bfb;"
| 47 || May 21 || @ Rangers  || 1–0 || Straily (2–2) || Darvish (7–2) || Balfour (9) || 42,510 || 25–22
|- style="text-align:center; style="background:#fbb;"
| 48 || May 22 || @ Rangers  || 1–3 || Wolf (1–0) || Parker (2–6) || Nathan (14) || 42,731 || 25–23
|- style="text-align:center; style="background:#bfb;"
| 49 || May 24 || @ Astros || 6–5 || Neshek (1–0) || Veras (0–3) || Balfour (10) || 15,907 || 26–23
|- style="text-align:center; style="background:#bfb;"
| 50 || May 25 || @ Astros || 11–5 || Griffin (5–3) || Harrell (3–6) ||  || 18,591 || 27–23
|- style="text-align:center; style="background:#bfb;"
| 51 || May 26 || @ Astros || 6–2 || Colón (5–2) || Keuchel (1–2) ||  || 19,366 || 28–23
|- style="text-align:center; style="background:#bfb;"
| 52 || May 27 || Giants || 4–1 || Straily (3–2) || Bumgarner (4–3) || Balfour (11) || 36,067 || 29–23
|- style="text-align:center; style="background:#bfb;"
| 53 || May 28 || Giants || 6–3 || Parker (3–6) || Kickham (0–1) || || 35,067 || 30–23
|- style="text-align:center; style="background:#bfb;"
| 54 || May 29 || @ Giants || 9–6 || Milone (5–5) || Lincecum (3–5) || Balfour (12) || 41,512 || 31–23
|- style="text-align:center; style="background:#fbb;"
| 55 || May 30 || @ Giants || 2–5 || Zito (4–3) || Griffin (5–4) || Romo (14) || 41,250 || 31–24
|- style="text-align:center; style="background:#bfb;"
| 56 || May 31 || White Sox || 3–0 || Colón (6–2) || Axelrod (3–4) ||  || 16,416 || 32–24
|-

|- style="text-align:center; style="background:#bfb;"
| 57 || June 1 || White Sox || 4–3 (10) || Blevins (4–0) || Santiago (1–4) ||  || 26,646 || 33–24 
|- style="text-align:center; style="background:#bfb;"
| 58 || June 2 || White Sox || 2–0 || Parker (4–6) || Sale (5–3) || Balfour (13) || 23,413 || 34–24 
|- style="text-align:center; style="background:#bfb;"
| 59 || June 3 || @ Brewers || 10–2 || Milone (6–5) || Estrada (4–4) ||  || 21,023 || 35–24
|- style="text-align:center; style="background:#fbb;"
| 60 || June 4 || @ Brewers || 3–4 (10) || Axford (2–3) || Neshek (1–1)  ||  || 24,230 || 35–25
|- style="text-align:center; style="background:#bfb;"
| 61 || June 5 || @ Brewers || 6–1 || Colón (7–2) || Gallardo (4–6) ||  || 25,912 || 36–25
|- style="text-align:center; style="background:#bfb;"
| 62 || June 6 || @ White Sox || 5–4 (10) || Blevins (5–0) || Thornton (0–2) || Balfour (14) || 21,156 || 37–25
|- style="text-align:center; style="background:#bfb;"
| 63 || June 7 || @ White Sox || 4–3 || Parker (5–6) || Sale (5–4) || Balfour (15) || 22,861 || 38–25
|- style="text-align:center; style="background:#fbb;"
| 64 || June 8 || @ White Sox || 1–4 || Danks (1–2) || Doolittle (3–1) || Reed (18) || 23,735 || 38–26
|- style="text-align:center; style="background:#fbb;"
| 65 || June 9 || @ White Sox || 2–4 || Santiago (2–4) || Griffin (5–5) || Reed (19) || 31,033 || 38–27
|- style="text-align:center; style="background:#bfb;"
| 66 || June 11 || Yankees || 6–4 || Colón (8–2) || Sabathia (6–5) || Balfour (16) || 27,118 || 39–27
|- style="text-align:center; style="background:#bfb;"
| 67 || June 12 || Yankees || 5–2 || Straily (4–2) || Hughes (3–5) || Balfour (17) || 25,176 || 40–27
|- style="text-align:center; style="background:#bfb;"
| 68 || June 13 || Yankees || 3–2 (18) || Chavez (1–0) || Claiborne (0–1) ||  || 27,569 || 41–27
|- style="text-align:center; style="background:#fbb;"
| 69 || June 14 || Mariners || 2–3 || Saunders (5–6) || Milone (6–6) || Pérez (1) || 31,448 || 41–28
|- style="text-align:center; style="background:#fbb;"
| 70 || June 15 || Mariners || 0–4 || Hernández (8-4) || Griffin (5–6) ||  || 24,378 || 41–29
|- style="text-align:center; style="background:#bfb;"
| 71 || June 16 || Mariners  || 10–2 || Colón (9–2) || Iwakuma (7–2) ||  || 36,067 || 42–29
|- style="text-align:center; style="background:#fbb;"
| 72 || June 17 || @ Rangers  || 7–8 || Cotts (3–1) || Chavez (1–1) || Nathan (21) || 30,489 || 42–30
|- style="text-align:center; style="background:#bfb;"
| 73 || June 18 || @ Rangers || 6–2 || Parker (6–6) || Darvish (7–3) ||  || 37,769 || 43–30
|- style="text-align:center; style="background:#fbb;"
| 74 || June 19 || @ Rangers  || 4–9 || Grimm (6–5) || Milone (6–7) ||  || 39,274 || 43–31
|- style="text-align:center; style="background:#fbb;"
| 75 || June 20 || @ Rangers  || 3–4 || Scheppers (5–0) || Doolittle (3–2) || Nathan (22) || 30,361 || 43–32
|- style="text-align:center; style="background:#bfb;"
| 76 || June 21 || @ Mariners  || 6–3 || Colón (10–2) || Iwakuma (7–2) || Balfour (18) || 23,086 || 44–32
|- style="text-align:center; style="background:#fbb;"
| 77 || June 22 || @ Mariners  || 5–7 || Medina (2–2) || Cook (1–1) ||  || 20,704 || 44–33
|- style="text-align:center; style="background:#fbb;"
| 78 || June 23 || @ Mariners || 3–6 || Pérez (2–1) || Balfour (0–1) ||  || 22,813 || 44–34
|- style="text-align:center; style="background:#bfb;"
| 79 || June 25 || Reds || 7–3 || Neshek (2–1) || Arroyo (6–6) ||  || 17,506 || 45–34
|- style="text-align:center; style="background:#bfb;"
| 80 || June 26 || Reds || 5–0 || Griffin (6–6) || Bailey (4–6) ||  || 25,658 || 46–34
|- style="text-align:center; style="background:#bfb;"
| 81 || June 28 || Cardinals || 6–1 || Colón (11–2) || Miller (8–6) ||  || 24,208 || 47–34
|- style="text-align:center; style="background:#fbb;"
| 82 || June 29 || Cardinals || 1–7 || Wainwright (11–5) || Chavez (1–2) ||  || 35,067 || 47–35
|- style="text-align:center; style="background:#bfb;"
| 83 || June 30 || Cardinals || 7–5 || Milone (7–7) || Westbrooke (4–3) || Balfour (19) || 20,673 || 48–35
|-

|- style="text-align:center; style="background:#bfb;"
| 84 || July 2 || Cubs || 8–7 || Otero (1–0) || Russell (1–2) || Balfour (20) || 17,273 || 49–35 
|- style="text-align:center; style="background:#fbb;"
| 85 || July 3 || Cubs || 1-3 || Garza (4–1) || Colón (11–3) || Gregg (14) || 35,067 || 49-36 
|- style="text-align:center; style="background:#bfb;"
| 86 || July 4 || Cubs || 1–0 || Straily (5–2) || Guerrier (2–4) || Balfour (21) || 26,967 || 50–36
|- style="text-align:center; style="background:#bfb;"
| 87 || July 5 || @ Royals || 6–3 || Milone (8–7) || Davis (4–7) || Balfour (22) || 35,518 || 51–36
|- style="text-align:center; style="background:#fbb;"
| 88 || July 6 || @ Royals || 3-4 || Crow (6–3) || Cook (1–2) || Holland (20) || 16,606 || 51–37
|- style="text-align:center; style="background:#bfb;"
| 89 || July 7 || @ Royals || 10–4 || Griffin (7–6) || Mendoza (2–5) || Chavez (1) || 17,804 || 52–37
|- style="text-align:center; style="background:#bfb;"
| 90 || July 8 || @ Pirates || 2–1 || Colón (12–3) || Locke (8–2) || Balfour (23) || 23,743 || 53–37
|- style="text-align:center; style="background:#bfb;"
| 91 || July 9 || @ Pirates || 2–1 || Straily (6-2) || Cole (4–2) || Balfour (24) || 24,560 || 54–37
|- style="text-align:center; style="background:#fbb;"
| 92 || July 10 || @ Pirates || 0-5 || Liriano (9–3) || Milone (8-8) ||  || 23,474 || 54-38
|- style="text-align:center; style="background:#fbb;"
| 93 || July 12 || Red Sox || 2-4 || Lackey (7–6)|| Doolittle (3–3) || Uehara (8) || 27,084 || 54–39
|- style="text-align:center; style="background:#bfb;"
| 94 || July 13 || Red Sox || 3–0 || Griffin (8–6) || Lester (8–6) || Balfour (25) || 36,067 || 55–39
|- style="text-align:center; style="background:#bfb;"
| 95 || July 14 || Red Sox || 3–2 (11) || Cook (2–2) || Thornton (0-4) ||  || 31,417 || 56-39
|- style="text-align:center; style="background:#fbb;"
| 96 || July 19 || @ Angels  || 1–4 ||  Weaver (4–5)||  Griffin (8–7)||  Frieri (23)||  43,415|| 56–40
|- style="text-align:center; style="background:#fbb;"
| 97 || July 20 || @ Angels  || 0–2 || Wilson (10–6) || Straily (6–3) || Frieri (24) || 43,572 || 56–41
|- style="text-align:center; style="background:#bfb;"
| 98 || July 21 || @ Angels  || 6–0 || Colón (13–3) || Williams (5–6) ||  || 37,441 || 57-41
|- style="text-align:center; style="background:#bfb;"
| 99 || July 22 || @ Astros  || 4–3 || Cook (3–2) || Wright (0-4) || Balfour (26) || 16,381 || 58-41
|- style="text-align:center; style="background:#fbb;"
| 100 || July 23 || @ Astros || 4-5 || Fields (1–1)|| Balfour (0–2) ||  || 32,249 || 58-42
|- style="text-align:center; style="background:#bfb;"
| 101 || July 24 || @ Astros || 4–3 || Griffin (9–7) || Blackley (1–1) || Cook (2) || 24,831 || 59-42
|- style="text-align:center; style="background:#fbb;"
| 102 || July 25 || Angels || 3–8 || Wilson (11–6) || Straily (6–4) ||  || 20,468 || 59-43
|- style="text-align:center; style="background:#bfb;"
| 103 || July 26 || Angels || 6–4 || Colón (14–3) || Williams (5–7) || Balfour (27) || 27,429 || 60–43
|- style="text-align:center; style="background:#bfb;"
| 104 || July 27 || Angels || 3–1 || Milone (9–8) || Downs (2–3) || Balfour (28) || 32,333 || 61-43
|- style="text-align:center; style="background:#bfb;"
| 105 || July 28 || Angels || 10–6 || Chavez (2–2) || Gutierrez (0–2) ||  || 25,877 || 62–43
|- style="text-align:center; style="background:#bfb;"
| 106 || July 29 || Blue Jays || 9–4 || Griffin (10–7) || Rogers (3–5) ||  || 13,309 || 63-43
|- style="text-align:center; style="background:#fbb;"
| 107 || July 30 || Blue Jays || 0–5 || Buehrle (7–7)|| Straily (6–5) ||  || 17,479 || 63–44
|- style="text-align:center; style="background:#fbb;"
| 108 || July 31 || Blue Jays || 2–5(10) || Janssen (4–0) || Chavez (2–3) || Cecil (1) || 23,638 || 63–45
|-

|- style="text-align:center; style="background:#fbb;"
| 109 || August 2 || Rangers || 3–8 || Frasor (2–2)|| Milone (9–9) ||  || 35,067 || 63-46
|- style="text-align:center; style="background:#bfb;"
| 110 || August 3 || Rangers || 4–2 || Parker (7–6) || Garza (1–1) || Balfour (29) ||  || 64-46
|- style="text-align:center; style="background:#fbb;"
| 111 || August 4 || Rangers || 0–4 || Holland (9–6) || Griffin (10–8) ||  || 23,263 || 64–47
|- style="text-align:center; style="background:#fbb;"
| 112 || August 6 || @ Reds || 1-3 || Latos (11–3) || Straily (6–6) || Chapman (26) || 34,640 || 64-48
|- style="text-align:center; style="background:#fbb;"
| 113 || August 7 || @ Reds || 5–6 || Bailey (7–10) || Colón (14–4) || Chapman (27) || 29,746 || 64-49
|- style="text-align:center; style="background:#bfb;"
| 114 || August 9 || @ Blue Jays || 14–6 || Parker (8–6) || Rogers (3–7) ||  || 31,862 || 65-49
|- style="text-align:center; style="background:#fbb;"
| 115 || August 10 || @ Blue Jays || 4-5 || Buehrle (8–7) || Gray (0–1) || Janssen (21) || 39,634 || 65-50
|- style="text-align:center; style="background:#bfb;"
| 116 || August 11 || @ Blue Jays || 6–4 || Cook (4–2) || Oliver (3–3) || Balfour (30) || 45,312 || 66-50
|- style="text-align:center; style="background:#bfb;"
| 117 || August 12 || @ Blue Jays || 5–1 || Cook (5–2) || Janssen (4–1) ||  || 36,111 || 67-50
|- style="text-align:center; style="background:#fbb;"
| 118 || August 13 || Astros || 4-5 || Lyles (5-6) || Colón (14–5) || Lo (1) || 14,261 || 67-51
|- style="text-align:center; style="background:#fbb;"
| 119 || August 14 || Astros || 1–2 (11) || Harrell (6–13) || Doolittle (3–4) || Fields (2) || 18,278 || 67-52
|- style="text-align:center; style="background:#bfb;"
| 120 || August 15 || Astros || 5–0 || Gray (1–1) || Bédard (3–9) ||  || 16,487 || 68-52
|- style="text-align:center; style="background:#bfb;"
| 121 || August 16 || Indians  || 3–2 || Doolittle (4–4) || Masterson (13–9) || Balfour (31) || 17,491 || 69-52
|- style="text-align:center; style="background:#fbb;"
| 122 || August 17 || Indians  || 7–11 || Jiménez (9–7) || Straily (6–7) ||  || 35,067 || 69-53
|- style="text-align:center; style="background:#bfb;"
| 123 || August 18 || Indians || 7–3 || Otero (2–0) || Kazmir (7–6) ||  || 21,114 || 70-53
|- style="text-align:center; style="background:#bfb;"
| 124 || August 19 || Mariners  || 2–1 || Parker (9–6) || Capps (2–3) ||  || 11,112 || 71–53
|- style="text-align:center; style="background:#fbb;"
| 125 || August 20 || Mariners  || 4–7 || Maurer (4–7) || Doolittle (4–5)  || Farquhar (8) || 13,041 || 71-54
|- style="text-align:center; style="background:#fbb;"
| 126 || August 21 || Mariners  || 3–5 || Iwakuma (12–6) || Griffin (10–9) || Farquhar (9) || 18,641 || 71–55
|- style="text-align:center; style="background:#fbb;"
| 127 || August 23 || @ Orioles || 7–9 || Rodríguez (3–1) || Cook (5–3) || Johnson (40) || 36,761  || 71-56
|- style="text-align:center; style="background:#bfb;"
| 128 || August 24 || @ Orioles || 2–1 || Parker (10–6) || O'Day (5–3) || Balfour (32) || 33,834 || 72-56
|- style="text-align:center; style="background:#fbb;"
| 129 || August 25 || @ Orioles || 3–10 || Feldman (11–9) || Gray (1–2) ||  || 33,820 || 72-57
|- style="text-align:center; style="background:#bfb;"
| 130 || August 26 || @ Tigers || 8–6 || Griffin (11–9) || Alvarez (1–4) || Balfour (33) || 34,778 || 73-57
|- style="text-align:center; style="background:#bfb;"
| 131 || August 27 || @ Tigers || 6–3 (6)|| Milone (10–9) || Verlander (12–10) ||  || 34,356 || 74-57
|- style="text-align:center; style="background:#bfb;"
| 132 || August 28 || @ Tigers || 14–4 || Straily (7–7) || Fister (11–7) || Anderson (1) || 31,973 || 75-57
|- style="text-align:center; style="background:#fbb;"
| 133 || August 29 || @ Tigers || 6–7 || Benoit (4–0) || Balfour (0–3) ||  || 39,212 || 75-58
|- style="text-align:center; style="background:#bfb;"
| 134 || August 30 || Rays || 4–3 || Cook (6–3) || Price (8–6) || Balfour (34) || 15,603 || 76-58
|- style="text-align:center; style="background:#bfb;"
| 135 || August 31 || Rays || 2–1 || Gray (2–2) || Cobb (2–2) || Balfour (35) || 35,067 || 77-58
|-

|- style="text-align:center; style="background:#bfb;"
| 136 || September 1 || Rays || 5–1 || Griffin (12–9) || Torres (4–1) ||  || 18,639 || 78-58 
|- style="text-align:center; style="background:#bfb;"
| 137 || September 2 || Rangers || 4–2 || Straily (8–7) || Holland (9–7) || Balfour (36) || 23,495 || 79-58 
|- style="text-align:center; style="background:#fbb;"
| 138 || September 3 || Rangers || 1–5 || Perez (9–3) || Colón (14–6) ||  || 16,133 || 79-59
|- style="text-align:center; style="background:#bfb;"
| 139 || September 4 || Rangers || 11–4 || Parker (11–6) || Darvish (12–7) || Anderson (2) || 18,886 || 80-59
|- style="text-align:center; style="background:#fbb;"
| 140 || September 5 || Astros || 2–3 || Peacock (4–5) || Gray (2–3) ||  || 11,569 || 80-60
|- style="text-align:center; style="background:#bfb;"
| 141 || September 6 || Astros || 7–5 || Griffin (13–9) || Keuchel (5–9) || Balfour (37) || 15,502 || 81-60
|- style="text-align:center; style="background:#bfb;"
| 142 || September 7 || Astros || 2–1 || Straily (9–7) || Oberholtzer (4–2) || Doolittle (1) || 20,340 || 82-60
|- style="text-align:center; style="background:#bfb;"
| 143 || September 8 || Astros || 7–2 || Colón (15–6) || Harrell (6–16) || Anderson (3) || 18,824 || 83-60
|- style="text-align:center; style="background:#fbb;"
| 144 || September 10 || @ Twins || 3–4 || Swarzak (2–2) || Cook (6–4) || Perkins (34) || 26,017 || 83-61
|- style="text-align:center; style="background:#bfb;"
| 145 || September 11 || @ Twins || 18–3 || Gray (3–3) || Pelfrey (5–12) ||  || 24,522 || 84–61
|- style="text-align:center; style="background:#bfb;"
| 146 || September 12 || @ Twins || 8–2 || Griffin (14–9) || Diamond (5–11) ||  || 26,188 || 85-61
|- style="text-align:center; style="background:#bfb;"
| 147 || September 13 || @ Rangers || 9–8 || Straily (10–7) || Holland (9–9) || Doolittle (2) || 40,180 || 86-61
|- style="text-align:center; style="background:#bfb;"
| 148 || September 14 || @ Rangers || 1–0 || Colón (16–6) || Darvish (12–9) || Balfour (38) || 36,067 || 87-61
|- style="text-align:center; style="background:#bfb;"
| 149 || September 15 || @ Rangers  || 5–1 || Milone (11–9) || Perez (9–5) ||  || 42,980 || 88-61
|- style="text-align:center; style="background:#fbb;"
| 150 || September 16 || Angels  || 1–12 || Wilson (17–6) || Parker (11–7) ||  || 14,629 || 88-62
|- style="text-align:center; style="background:#bfb;"
| 151 || September 17 || Angels || 2–1 || Balfour (1–3) || Kohn (1–3) ||  || 18,771 || 89-62
|- style="text-align:center; style="background:#fbb;"
| 152 || September 18 || Angels  || 4–5 (11)|| Gutierrez (1–4) || Chavez (2–4) || Frieri (35) || 20,260 || 89-63
|- style="text-align:center; style="background:#bfb;"
| 153 || September 19 || Twins  || 8–6 || Doolittle (5-5) || Martis (0–1) ||  || 11,461 || 90-63
|- style="text-align:center; style="background:#bfb;"
| 154 || September 20 || Twins  || 11–0 || Colón (17–6) || Albers (2–4) ||  || 36,067 || 91-63
|- style="text-align:center; style="background:#bfb;"
| 155 || September 21 || Twins || 9–1 || Parker (12–7) || Hernández (3–2) ||  || 26,393 || 92-63
|- style="text-align:center; style="background:#bfb;"
| 156 || September 22 || Twins || 11-7 || Gray (4–3)|| De Vries (0–1) ||  || 30,589 || 93-63
|- style="text-align:center; style="background:#bfb;"
| 157 || September 23 || @ Angels || 10–5 || Milone (12–9) || Richards (7–7) ||  || 41,147 || 94-63
|- style="text-align:center; style="background:#fbb;"
| 158 || September 24 || @ Angels || 0–3 || Vargas (9–7) || Griffin (14–10) ||  || 38,158 || 94-64
|- style="text-align:center; style="background:#fbb;"
| 159 || September 25 || @ Angels || 1–3 || Weaver (11–8) || Straily (10–8) || Frieri (37) || 36,226 || 94-65
|- style="text-align:center; style="background:#bfb;"
| 160 || September 27 || @ Mariners || 8–2 || Colón (18–6) || Hernández (12–10) ||  || 23,041 || 95-65
|- style="text-align:center; style="background:#fbb;"
| 161 || September 28 || @ Mariners || 5–7 || Maurer (5–8) || Parker (12–8) || Farquhar (16) || 17,751 || 95-66
|- style="text-align:center; style="background:#bfb;"
| 162 || September 29 || @ Mariners || 9–0 || Gray (5–3) || Ramirez (5–3) ||  || 17,081 || 96-66
|-

Record against opponents

Roster

Postseason

American League Division Series

Game 1, October 4

9:37 p.m. (EDT) at O.co Coliseum in Oakland, California

Game 2, October 5

9:07 p.m. (EDT) at O.co Coliseum in Oakland, California

Game 3, October 7

1:07 p.m. (EDT) at Comerica Park in Detroit, Michigan

Game 4, October 8

5:07 p.m. (EDT) at Comerica Park in Detroit, Michigan

Game 5, October 10

8:07 p.m. (EDT) at O.co Coliseum in Oakland, California

Farm system

References

External links

2013 Oakland Athletics season at Baseball Reference
2013 Oakland Athletics season Official Site

Oakland Athletics seasons
Oakland Athletics
American League West champion seasons
2010s in Oakland, California
Oak